The Supreme Court of the Republic of Lithuania is the only court of cassation in the Republic of Lithuania for reviewing effective judgements and rulings passed by the courts hearing criminal cases at the first and appeal instances as well as decisions and rulings in civil cases passed by the courts of appeal instance.

The Supreme Court was established by the Constitution of the Republic of Lithuania of 1992. It began the activities in 1994 when the Law establishing the Court came into force. Since its inception, the Court has been located in the city of Vilnius, Gynėjų street.

Activities

According to the Paragraph 2 of the Article 23 of the Law on Courts of the Republic of Lithuania The Supreme Court shall develop a uniform case-law in the interpretation and application of statutes and other legal acts. A ruling passed by the court of cassation is final, cannot be appealed against and effective from the day of its adoption.

Cases before the Supreme Court are normally heard by a panel of three judges. In the instances where a cassation case involves a complicated issue of interpretation or application of laws, the President of the Supreme Court, the Chairman of the relevant Division, or a panel of judges may forward the case to be heard by an extended panel of seven judges or by a plenary session of the relevant Division.

Composition

The Supreme Court has the Civil Division and the Criminal Division. The Supreme Court of Lithuania is composed of 37 judges.

Supreme Court Presidents
 Gabriele Juodkaitė-Granskienė (acting, as of 2022)
 (acting)
 (2009-2017)
 (1999-2008)

Criminal Division Chairpersons
 Gabriele Juodkaitė-Granskienė(as of 2022)
Aurelius Gutauskas 
Jonas Prapiestis (2007-
 (2003-2007)
  (1995-1999)

Civil Division Chairpersons
 
 (2007-)

External links
 Official website

References

1994 establishments in Lithuania
Lithuania
Judiciary of Lithuania
Courts and tribunals established in 1994